Mayovka is a rural locality (a settlement) in Krasnoplamenskoye Rural Settlement, Alexandrovsky District, Vladimir Oblast, Russia. The population was 62 as of 2010. There are 4 streets.

Geography 
Mayovka is located 36 km northwest of Alexandrov (the district's administrative centre) by road. Tiribrovo is the nearest rural locality.

References 

Rural localities in Alexandrovsky District, Vladimir Oblast